Leucopogon australis, commonly known as spiked beard-heath, is a species of flowering plant in the heath family Ericaceae and is endemic to southern Australia. It is an erect, aromatic shrub with narrowly egg-shaped to narrowly elliptic leaves, and white flowers arranged in spikes near the ends of branchlets.

Description

Taxonomy and naming
Leucopogon australis was first formally described in 1810 by Robert Brown in his Prodromus Florae Novae Hollandiae. The specific epithet (australis) means "southern".

Distribution and habitat
This leucopogon grows in the understorey of forest in wetter places within  of the coast of Western Australia between Gingin, Augusta and Albany, Peterborough and Yarram in Victoria, and northern Tasmania, where it is rare.

References

australis
Ericales of Australia
Flora of Western Australia
Flora of Victoria (Australia)
Flora of Tasmania
Plants described in 1810
Taxa named by Robert Brown (botanist, born 1773)